Harry Meade (born 4 July 1983) is a British eventing rider. Representing Great Britain, he competed at the 2014 World Equestrian Games in Normandy, France, where he won a team silver medal. In 2004 he was shortlisted for the Young Rider European Championships with the horse Midnight Dazzler.

Harry is a son of Richard Meade, multiple Olympic gold medalist in eventing.

References

Living people
1983 births
British male equestrians